Metidiocerus is a genus of true bugs belonging to the family Cicadellidae.

The species of this genus are found in Europe.

Species:
 Metidiocerus crassipes (Sahlberg, 1871) 
 Metidiocerus impressifrons (Kirschbaum, 1868)

References

Cicadellidae
Hemiptera genera